The Hindon River metro station is located on the Red Line of the Delhi Metro. It is located in the Sahibabad Industrial Area locality of Ghaziabad of Uttar Pradesh. It is close to tourist destinations including the City forest and the Hindon River. The station serves one of most popular areas of the Raj Nagar Extension. It is located near and named after the Hindon River.

Station layout

Facilities

List of available ATM at Hindon metro station are

Connections

Exits

See also

References

External links

 Delhi Metro Rail Corporation Ltd. (Official site)
 Delhi Metro Annual Reports
 
 UrbanRail.Net — descriptions of all metro systems in the world, each with a schematic map showing all stations.

Delhi Metro stations
Railway stations in Ghaziabad district, India